Don McKellar  (born August 17, 1963) is a Canadian actor, writer, playwright, and filmmaker. He was part of a loosely-affiliated group of filmmakers to emerge from Toronto known as the Toronto New Wave. 

He is known for directing and writing the film Last Night, which won the Prix de la Jeunesse at the 1998 Cannes Film Festival, as well as his screenplays for films like Thirty Two Short Films About Glenn Gould, The Red Violin, and Blindness. McKellar frequently acts in his own projects, and has also appeared in Atom Egoyan’s Exotica and David Cronenberg’s eXistenZ and Crimes of the Future.

He is also known for being a fixture on Canadian television, with series including Twitch City, Odd Job Jack, and Slings and Arrows, as well as writing the book for the popular Tony Award winning musical The Drowsy Chaperone. He is an eight-time nominee and two-time Genie Award winner.

Personal life
McKellar was born in Toronto, Ontario, the son of Marjorie Kay (Stirrett), a teacher, and John Duncan McKellar, a corporate lawyer. He attended Glenview Senior Public School, Lawrence Park Collegiate Institute and later studied English at the University of Toronto's Victoria College.

McKellar married his longtime partner, Canadian actress Tracy Wright, on January 3, 2010. Wright died from cancer on June 22, 2010.

Career
McKellar was a founding member of Toronto's Augusta Company, along with his future wife Tracy Wright and Daniel Brooks.

McKellar made his first screen appearance in 1989 in Bruce McDonald's film Roadkill, for which he also wrote the screenplay. McKellar's work on Roadkill earned him Genie Award nominations for best supporting actor and best screenwriter, attracting the attention of many in Canada. Roadkill also won the Toronto-Citytv Award for best Canadian feature.

McKellar collaborated again with McDonald for his 1991 film Highway 61, writing the screenplay and playing the starring role as the barber Pokey Jones. Again McKellar's work solicited wide praise, earning him a second Genie nomination for best screenwriter and a nomination for best actor. McKellar's most recent collaboration with McDonald spawned the cult classic television series Twitch City, in which McKellar played the starring role of Curtis, a television addict and shut-in.

Since his entry into Canadian cinema, McKellar has also been involved in numerous projects. He appeared in Atom Egoyan's films The Adjuster (1991) and Exotica (1994), the latter of which earned him the Genie for best supporting actor. McKellar collaborated with François Girard, authoring the screenplays for his films Thirty Two Short Films About Glenn Gould (1992), and the Academy Award winning (Best Original Score) The Red Violin (1998), in which McKellar starred alongside Samuel L. Jackson.  He also appeared alongside Jude Law and Jennifer Jason Leigh in David Cronenberg's 1999 film eXistenZ.

McKellar has emerged as a filmmaker in his own right; his directorial debut, Last Night (1998), which he also wrote and in which he also starred, garnered impressive critical acclaim, winning the Prix de la Jeunesse at the Cannes Film Festival and the Claude Jutra Award at the Genies. In 2001, he played the role of Oliver Tapscrew in the TV children's drama series I Was a Rat. His second film, Childstar, opened in 2004 at the Toronto International Film Festival to enthusiastic reviews.

McKellar also starred in the animated sitcom Odd Job Jack as the titular hero, Jack Ryder, which ran for four seasons between 2004 and 2007 on The Comedy Network.

McKellar has appeared in all three seasons of television's Slings & Arrows, as Darren Nichols, a theatre director. The show is co-written by Bob Martin, who collaborated with McKellar on the musical The Drowsy Chaperone. Martin and McKellar also cocreated the Canadian television sitcom Michael, Tuesdays and Thursdays, scheduled to debut on CBC Television in fall 2011.

In 2006, he appeared in Ken Finkleman's miniseries At The Hotel. In June 2006 he won the Tony Award for Best Book of a Musical and the Drama Desk Award for Outstanding Book of a Musical for The Drowsy Chaperone. He received a Gemini Award nomination for his role as socialist politician Clarence Fines in Prairie Giant: The Tommy Douglas Story.

McKellar hosted the CBC Radio One series High Definition. He co-starred in and wrote the 2008 screen adaptation of José Saramago's 1995 novel Blindness.

In 2016, he was made a Member of the Order of Canada "for his contributions to Canadian culture as an actor, writer and director".

Selected filmography 
 Highway 61 (1991)
 Arrowhead (1994)
 The Red Violin (1998)
 Last Night (1998)
 Elimination Dance (1998)
 The Herd (1998)
 eXistenZ (1999)
 A Word from the Management (2000)
 Childstar (2004)
 Green Door (2008)
 Cooking With Stella (2010)
 The Grand Seduction (2013)
 Treading Water (2013)
 Zoom (2015)
 Meditation Park (2017)
 Blood Honey (2017)
 Through Black Spruce (2018)
 Most Wanted (2020)
 The Curse of Audrey Earnshaw (2020)
 The Middle Man (2021)
 Crimes of the Future (2022)

Television
 Twitch City (1998-2000)
 Slings and Arrows (2003-2006)
 Odd Job Jack (2003-2007)
 Michael: Tuesdays and Thursdays (2011)
 Sensitive Skin (2014, 6 episodes)

References

External links

 

1963 births
Living people
Male actors from Toronto
Canadian male film actors
Canadian male television actors
Canadian male voice actors
Best First Feature Genie and Canadian Screen Award winners
Film directors from Toronto
Best Screenplay Genie and Canadian Screen Award winners
Best Supporting Actor Genie and Canadian Screen Award winners
Members of the Order of Canada
University of Toronto alumni
20th-century Canadian male actors
21st-century Canadian male actors
Best Actor in a Comedy Series Canadian Screen Award winners
Canadian Film Centre alumni
Canadian Comedy Award winners
Tony Award winners